The 1991 Preakness Stakes was the 116th running of the Preakness Stakes thoroughbred horse race. The race took place on May 18, 1991, and was televised in the United States on the ABC television network. Hansel, who was jockeyed by Jerry Bailey, won the race by seven lengths over runner-up Corporate Report.  Approximate post time was 5:32 p.m. Eastern Time. The race was run over a fast track in a final time of 1:54 flat. The Maryland Jockey Club reported total attendance of 96,695, this is recorded as second highest on the list of American thoroughbred racing top attended events for North America in 1991.

Payout 

The 116th Preakness Stakes Payout Schedule

$2 Exacta:  (4–1) paid   $212.20

$2 Trifecta:  (4-1–2) paid   $3,310.50

The full chart 

 Winning Breeder: Marvin Little Jr.; (VA)
 Final Time: 1:54.00
 Track Condition: Fast
 Total Attendance: 96,695

See also 

 1991 Kentucky Derby

References

External links 

 

1991
1991 in horse racing
1991 in American sports
1991 in sports in Maryland
Horse races in Maryland